Kavekini Nalaga (born Nadroga, circa 1965) is a Fijian former rugby union footballer who played as wing. He is the father of Napolioni Nalaga, who also plays as wing.

Career
His first cap for Fiji was during the match against Samoa, at Nuku'alofa, on 2 July 1986. Nalaga was in the 1987 Rugby World Cup roster, where he played the match against Argentina, in Hamilton, on 24 May. His last international cap was against Tonga, in Suva, on 15 July 1989.

Notes

External links

1965 births
Fijian rugby union players
Rugby union wings
Living people
People from Nadroga-Navosa Province
I-Taukei Fijian people
Fiji international rugby union players